Rømsjøen is a lake in the former municipality of Rømskog in the former county of Østfold, Norway.

See also
List of lakes in Norway

Rømskog
Lakes of Viken (county)